Nathan Moore (at times identified under the pen name Percy Boyd) is a United States-based folk music guitarist and singer-songwriter best known for being a founding member of both ThaMuseMeant and Surprise Me Mr. Davis. Moore has also released numerous solo albums on Frogville Records, an independent record company he co-founded with John Treadwell. A prolific songwriter, Moore has written over one thousand songs. In June 2008, Moore won the prestigious Telluride Bluegrass Festival Troubadour Competition, performing for 10,000 festival goers and winning a custom made guitar.

His most recent project (2017) is called The Whole Other, featuring Nathan's songs and sounds on an electronic backdrop, partnered with multi-instrumentalist and collaborator Lex Park.

Biography

Surprise Me Mr. Davis
Surprise Me Mr. Davis is an electro-folk band consisting of Nathan Moore and the members of avant-rock band The Slip. They formed in 2003 in Boston while Moore was visiting The Slip at their apartment and the Blizzard of 2003 hit. When they were snowed in, Moore and The Slip spent the time playing with home recording equipment, the result eventually becoming their self-titled album. During the period in which they were snowed in, the band members would ask each other what they should play on their instruments. The typical answer soon became "Surprise me". Toward the end of the week, Nathan Moore received a message on his cell phone from the voice of an elderly lady with a rich accent saying, "Mister Davis, you're having fun with that recording!" It was a wrong number, but the band decided to merge "Surprise Me." and "Mister Davis", thus making the official band name Surprise Me Mr. Davis. In the winter of 2004, the band toured for the first time in the Northeast. The clubs they played included the Tin Cup in Philadelphia, Savannah's in Albany, New York, and Eclipse Theater in Waitsfield, Vermont. In March and April 2005, they again played a Northeast tour. Later that year in November, they played a California tour, hitting clubs such as The Independent in San Francisco, Sweetwater in Mill Valley, California, Moe's Alley in Santa Cruz, and Winston's in San Diego. They have also played High Sierra Music Festival every year since forming. At the 2006, 2007, 2008, 2009 and 2010 High Sierra Music Festival, they played surprise late night shows at Camp Harry. Keyboardist Marco Benevento joined the band in 2009.

2007: In His Own Worlds
Moore's seventh solo effort, In His Own Worlds, was released on Frogville Records on June 27, 2008. Moore picked the title of the album by weeding out all other "bad" choices, and settled on one that used wordplay, although Moore stated that "it doesn't seem to be the best marketing angle in America." In a 2007 feature article with JamBase, Moore explained how his religion influenced the making of the album:

Contemporary music critics responded positively to In His Own Worlds. Dennis Cook of JamBase called the album "brilliant", and said that the album was "Nathan Moore at his best, which is saying something."

Songwriting
For Moore songwriting is "...a very elusive and mysterious thing to talk about...You feel like people saying they feel like they're a conduit, that something is passing through them.  I wouldn't necessarily say that that's true, but it does feel like that."

"The sharp, introspective lyrics of Nathan Moore draw an instant connection to the great folk singers of the past." -Paste Magazine

"Nathan Moore…is one of the greatest songwriters we have and the faucet is always on pouring fresh songs out like water." Aaron Case- Jambase

"Moore has a timeless sound that falls easily into place next to those hollowed names that came before him – Seeger, Havens, and Dylan." - AmericanaUK

Discography

Solo 
1999: Single Wide
2002: Percy Boyd's Lost Tracks
2002: Live at the Blackfriars Playhouse
2002: Sad Songs Make Me Happy
2003: Other Wise Blue Skies
2003: Cans 'n' Can'ts
2007: In His Own Worlds
2008: You Yeah Smokin' Hot
2009: Folk Singer (EP)
2011: Dear Puppeteer 
2013: Hippy Fiasco Rides Again
2014: Dandelion Killers
2015: Enough About Me
2016: Goodbye America
2017: The Whole Other
2021: Holler & Hope

With Surprise Me Mr. Davis
2004: Surprise Me Mr. Davis
2005: Only in Montreal
2010: That Man Eats Morning For Breakfast

With ThaMuseMeant
1995: Live at the Mineshaft Tavern
1997: Breakfast Epiphanies
1998: Sweet Things
2000: Grow Your Own
2001: Nudes
2004: Silver Seed
2006: Never Settle for Less

References

External links
 Nathan's Official Website
Nathan Moore interviewed
Nathan Moore – Poet, Wordsmith, Songwriter Interview from HonestTune.com
Nathan Moore: Wild & Free on TheWaster.com

American folk guitarists
American male guitarists
Singer-songwriters from Virginia
1970 births
Living people
People from Staunton, Virginia
People from Clifton Forge, Virginia
Guitarists from Virginia
21st-century American male singers
21st-century American singers
21st-century American guitarists
American male singer-songwriters